The  was a commuter electric multiple unit (EMU) train type operated by the private railway operator Odakyu Electric Railway in Japan from 1972 until 2006.

Technical specifications
The trains were equipped with 110 kW motors and chopper control.

Formations
The fleet consisted of nine four-car and nine six-car sets. The sets were formed as follows.

Four-car sets

Six-car sets

History
The trains entered service in 1972, and were the recipient of the 1973 Laurel Prize. Chiyoda Line through services with 9000 series trains began on March 31, 1978. The trains were withdrawn from service in March 2006.

Preserved examples
Deha 9001: stored at the Kitami inspection facility

Derivatives
Trains of a similar design operate on the Roca Line in Argentina.

References

Electric multiple units of Japan
9000 series
1500 V DC multiple units of Japan
Tokyu Car multiple units
Kawasaki multiple units